Hidden Island, known to the traditional owners as Banggoon, is an uninhabited island located in the Kimberley region of Western Australia.

It is situated in the western group of the Buccaneer Archipelago, of which it is the largest island.

The island is covered in low scrub and stunted gum trees.

Hidden Island is separated from nearby Chambers Island by Whirlpool Passage. It is separated from the mainland by a narrow channel.

Priority flora found on the area include Solanum leopoldense Symon.

The Aboriginal Australian traditional owners of the area are the Mayala (the Yawijibaya and Unggarranggu) peoples of the Worrorran languages group, whose name for the island is Banggoon.

References 

Buccaneer Archipelago
Uninhabited islands of Australia